Ainehvand-e Darreh Rashteh (also Romanized as Aīnehvand-e Dārreh Rashteh) is a village in Jeygaran Rural District, Ozgoleh District, Salas-e Babajani County, Kermanshah Province, Iran. At the 2006 census, its population was 79, in 15 families.

References 

Populated places in Salas-e Babajani County